Pico do Facho is the highest peak on Porto Santo Island, with  in altitude. The bonfire could be seen from Ponta de São Lourenço on the main island of Madeira.

There are no roads leading to the top of the peak, however there is a path from Pico do Castelo to Pico do Facho and to some nearby peaks about 1.5 - 2 hours walk.

References

Geography of Madeira
Mountains of Portugal